Djedkare Isesi (known in Greek as Tancheres) was a pharaoh, the eighth and penultimate ruler of the Fifth Dynasty of Egypt in the late 25th century to mid-24th century BC, during the Old Kingdom. Djedkare succeeded Menkauhor Kaiu and was in turn succeeded by Unas. His relationship to both of these pharaohs remain uncertain, although it is often conjectured that Unas was Djedkare's son, owing to the smooth transition between the two.

Djedkare likely enjoyed a reign of more than 40 years, which heralded a new period in the history of the Old Kingdom. Breaking with a tradition followed by his predecessors since the time of Userkaf, Djedkare did not build a temple to the sun god Ra, possibly reflecting the rise of Osiris in the Egyptian pantheon. More significantly, Djedkare effected comprehensive reforms of the Egyptian state administration, the first undertaken since the inception of the system of ranking titles. He also reorganised the funerary cults of his forebears buried in the necropolis of Abusir and reformed the corresponding priesthood.

Djedkare commissioned expeditions to Sinai to procure copper and turquoise, to Nubia for its gold and diorite and to the fabled Land of Punt for its incense. One such expedition had what could be the earliest recorded instance of oracular divination undertaken to ensure an expedition's success. The word "Nub", meaning gold, to designate Nubia is first recorded during Djedkare's reign. Under his rule, Egypt also entertained continuing trade relations with the Levantine coast and made punitive raids in Canaan. In particular, one of the earliest depictions of a battle or siege scene was found in the tomb of one of Djedkare's subjects.

Djedkare is believed to have been buried in a pyramid in Saqqara named Nefer Djedkare ("Djedkare is perfect"), which is now ruined owing to theft of stone from its outer casing during antiquity. When excavated in the 1940s, the burial chamber contained mummified skeletal remains thought to belong to Djedkare. Examinations of the mummy revealed the individual died in his fifties. A clue to the identity of the remains came from skeletal and blood type comparisons with those of two females thought to be Djedkare's daughters buried in the nearby Southern Cemetery as Abusir. Radio carbon dating carried out on the effects of the three individuals revealed a common range of 2886-2507 BC, some 160–390 years older than the accepted chronology of the 5th Dynasty.

After his death, Djedkare was the object of a cult that lasted at least until the end of the Old Kingdom. He seemed to have been held in particularly high esteem during the mid-Sixth Dynasty, whose pharaohs lavished rich offerings on his cult. Archaeological evidence suggests the continuing existence of this funerary cult throughout the much later New Kingdom (c. 1550–1077 BC). Djedkare was also remembered by the ancient Egyptians as the Pharaoh of Vizier Ptahhotep, the purported author of The Maxims of Ptahhotep, one of the earliest pieces of philosophic wisdom literature.

The reforms implemented by Djedkare are generally assessed negatively in modern Egyptology as his policy of decentralization created a virtual feudal system that transferred much power to the high and provincial administrations. Some Egyptologists such as Naguib Kanawati argue that this contributed heavily to the collapse of the Egyptian state during the First Intermediate Period, c. 200 years later. These conclusions are rejected by Nigel Strudwick, who says that in spite of Djedkare's reforms, Ancient Egyptian officials never amassed enough power to rival that of the king.

Attestations

Contemporaneous sources
Djedkare is well attested in sources contemporaneous with his reign. The tombs of many of his courtiers and family members have been discovered in Giza, Saqqara and Abusir. They give insights into the administrative reforms that Djedkare conducted during his reign and, in a few cases, even record letters that the king sent to his officials. These letters, inscribed on the walls of tombs, typically present royal praises for the tomb owner.

Another important source of information about Egypt during the reign of Djedkare is the Abusir papyri. These are administrative documents, covering a period of 24 years during Djedkare's reign; they were discovered in the mortuary temples of pharaohs Neferirkare Kakai, Neferefre and queen Khentkaus II. In addition to these texts, the earliest letters on papyrus preserved to the present day also date to Djedkare's reign, dealing with administrative or private matters.

Historical sources
Djedkare is attested in four ancient Egyptian king lists, all dating to the New Kingdom. The earliest of these is the Karnak king list, dating to the reign of Thutmose III (1479–1425 BC), where Djedkare is mentioned on the fifth entry. Djedkare's prenomen occupies the 32nd entry of the Abydos King List, which was written during the reign of Seti I (1290–1279 BC). Djedkare is also present on the Saqqara Tablet (31st entry) where he is listed under the name "Maatkare", probably because of a scribal error. Djedkare's prenomen is given as "Djed" on the Turin canon (third column, 24th row), probably because of a lacuna affecting the original document from which the canon was copied during the reign of Ramses II (1279–1213 BC). The Turin canon credits Djedkare with 28 years of reign.

In addition to these sources, Djedkare is mentioned on the Prisse Papyrus dating to the 12th Dynasty (c. 1990–1800 BC). The papyrus records The Maxims of Ptahhotep and gives Djedkare's nomen "Isesi" to name the pharaoh whom the purported authors of the maxims, vizier Ptahhotep, served.
Djedkare was also probably mentioned in the Aegyptiaca, a history of Egypt written in the 3rd century BC during the reign of Ptolemy II (283–246 BC) by the Egyptian priest Manetho. No copies of the Aegyptiaca have survived to this day and it is known to us only through later writings by Sextus Julius Africanus and Eusebius. Africanus relates that a pharaoh Tancheres (Ancient Greek Τανχέρης) reigned for 44 years as the eighth and penultimate king of the Fifth Dynasty. Given its position within the dynasty, Tancheres is believed to be his Hellenized name.

Family

Parents

Djedkare's parentage is unknown; in particular his relation with his predecessors Menkauhor Kaiu and Nyuserre Ini cannot be ascertained. Djedkare is generally thought to have been the son of Menkauhor Kaiu, but the two might instead have been brothers and sons of Nyuserre Ini. Another hypothesis suggests that Djedkare and Menkauhor could have been cousins, being sons of Nyuserre and Neferefre respectively.
The identity of Djedkare's mother is similarly unknown.

Queens
The name of Djedkare's principal wife was Setibhor. This important queen consort whose name was lost but found in 2019 was the owner of a large pyramid complex located to the northeast of Djedkare's pyramid in Saqqara. This could indicate that she was the mother of Djedkare's successor, Unas, or that Djedkare owed the throne to her. The very high status of this queen is suggested by some features of her funerary complex that are otherwise reserved to kings: her pyramid has its own satellite pyramid, has a causeway leading from a valley temple up to a mortuary temple devoted to the cult of the queen and had an entrance hall pr-wrw, an open courtyard and a square antechamber. Furthermore, some reliefs showing the queen had been reworked with royal insignia and vultures added above her head. Since the construction of the queen's pyramid was apparently undertaken after the planning of Djedkare's pyramid and her relief had been reworked, the Egyptologist Klaus Baer suggests that this queen may have ruled after the death of Djedkare, playing an important role in his succession. This is rejected by other Egyptologists, such as Michel Baud, owing to the lack of evidence for a regency or interregnum between Djedkare and Unas.

The Egyptologist Wilfried Seipel has proposed that this pyramid was initially intended for queen Meresankh IV, whom he and Verner see as a wife of Djedkare. Seipel contends that Meresankh was finally buried in a smaller mastaba in Saqqara North after she fell into disgrace. Alternatively, Aidan Dodson and Dyan Hilton have proposed that she was a wife of the preceding king, Menkauhor Kaiu.

Sons

Only one son of Djedkare has been identified for certain, Neserkauhor, who bore the title of "eldest beloved king's son of his body". Neserkauhor also bore the title of Iry-pat, showing that he was an important member of the royal court, as well as a priestly title "Greatest of the Five in the temple of Thoth", suggesting that he may have been a vizier or had similar occupations.

As well as Neserkauhor, there is indirect evidence that princes Raemka and Kaemtjenent are sons of Djedkare based on the dating and general location of their tombs in Saqqara. For example, the tomb of Kaemtjenent mentions vizier Rashepses, who served during the reign of Djedkare. Raemka also bore the title of "king's son of his body", almost exclusively reserved to true princes of royal blood. The locations of Raemka's and Kaemtjenent's tombs have led some Egyptologists to believe that both princes are sons of queen Meresankh IV buried nearby, who would thus be one of Djedkare's wives. These conclusions are debated, in particular in the case of Kaemtjenent, whose title of "king's son" may have been purely honorific.

A high official named Isesi-ankh could have been yet another son of Djedkare, as suggested by his name meaning "Isesi lives". Yet, similarities in the titles and locations of the tombs of Isesi-ankh and Kaemtjenent have led Egyptologists to propose that they could instead be brothers and sons of Meresankh IV, or that the former is a son of the latter. Even though Isesi-ankh bore the title of "king's son", the Egyptologists Michel Baud and Bettina Schmitz argue that this filiation was fictitious, being only an honorary title.

Finally, the successor of Djedkare, Unas, is thought to have been his son in spite of the complete lack of evidence bearing on the question. The main argument in favor of this filiation is that the succession from Djedkare to Unas seems to have been smooth, as suggested indirectly, for example, by the Abusir papyri. Indirect evidence also comes from the reliefs of Unas' causeway, which show many officials bearing names incorporating "Isesi", suggesting at the very least that Unas did not perceive Djedkare as an antagonist.

Daughters
Several daughters of Djedkare have been identified by the title of "king's daughter of his body" and the general date of their tomb. These include Kekheretnebti, whose filiation is clearly indicated by her other title of "Beloved of Isesi", Meret-Isesi, Hedjetnebu, and Nebtyemneferes. Less certain is the filiation of Kentkhaus, wife of vizier Senedjemib Mehi, who bore the title of "king's daughter of his body". It is debated whether this title indicates a true filiation or if it is only honorary.

Chronology

The relative chronological position of Djedkare as the eighth and penultimate ruler of the Fifth Dynasty, succeeding Menkauhor Kaiu and preceding Unas on the throne, is well established by historical sources and confirmed by archaeological evidence.

The duration of Djedkare's reign is much less certain. Djedkare's time on the throne is well documented by the Abusir papyri, numerous royal seals and contemporary inscriptions; taken together, they indicate a fairly long rule for this king. While the Turin canon credits him with 28 years of reign, there is direct evidence for an even longer reign. Several artefacts and inscriptions have been uncovered relating to Djedkare's rejuvenation or "sed" festival, normally celebrated only after 30 years of reign. For example, the tomb of one of Djedkare's viziers, Senedjemib Inti, relates construction works undertaken during the year of the 16th cattle count in preparation for the festival ceremonies. An alabaster vase now on display at the Louvre museum bears an inscription celebrating Djedkare's first sed festival, indicating in all likelihood that he reigned beyond his 30th year on the throne.

One of the Abusir papyri was found to be dated to the "Year of the 22nd Count, IV Akhet day 12", constituting Djedkare's latest known date. This date might correspond to any time from the 32nd year of Djedkare's reign up to his 44th year on the throne, depending on whether the cattle count was once every two years or once every year and a half. The higher estimate is close to Manetho's 44-year figure credited to Tancheres, the Hellenized name of Djedkare, although this may just be coincidental. Modern estimates thus put Djedkare's reign length as certainly more than 33 years and, if the cattle count was regularly biennial, at least 42 to 44 years. This makes Djedkare the longest reigning king of the Fifth Dynasty.

Reign

The reign of Djedkare heralded a new period in the history of the Old Kingdom. First, he did not build a sun temple, as his predecessors had done since the time of Userkaf, some 80 years earlier. This may be a result of the increased prominence of Osiris compared with the sun god Ra during the late Fifth Dynasty. The rise of Osiris corresponds to changes in the role of the king with respect to the wider Egyptian society. In particular, the king loses his role as the sole guarantor of the afterlife, which now becomes available beyond the immediate royal circle. These changes demythologise the king's position and, as the Egyptologist Hans Goedicke writes, make him fully human yet still socially dominant.
The importance of the cult of Osiris becomes manifest when the Pyramid Texts of the pyramid of Unas are inscribed a few decades later. In this context, it is perhaps noteworthy that the only known statue of Djedkare was discovered in the ruins of the temple of Osiris, in Abydos. Another manifestation of the winds of change during Djedkare's time on the throne is the confirmation of the relocation of the royal necropolis from Abusir, where it had been since the reign of Sahure, to Saqqara, where Menkauhor Kaiu, Djedkare and his successor, Unas, built their pyramids. Abusir may have become overcrowded by the time of Menkauhor's accession and the capital may have been shifted south to Saqqara, along with the royal necropolis, around the same time. The abandonment of Abusir as a royal necropolis and the termination of sun temple building are possibly related, given the close association between the two since the reign of Userkaf.

Domestic reforms

During his reign Djedkare effected significant reforms of the state administration and priesthood, in particular that pertaining to the funerary cults in the necropolis of Abusir.
These evolutions are witnessed by changes in priestly titles and more broadly, in the system of ranking titles of high officials, which was modified for the first time in its existence. For example, the priesthood of the royal pyramids was reorganized, with Djedkare possibly changing the titles and functions of the priests from "priest of king" to "priest of the pyramid", although this change may have happened earlier, under Nyuserre Ini.
Princes of royal blood could once more hold administrative titles, a prerogative they had lost during the early Fifth Dynasty. At the same time, viziers could now hold the prestigious titles of Iry-pat and Haty-a and, as "overseer of the royal scribes", became the head of the scribal administration. At least one vizier, Seshemnefer III, even bore the title of "king's son of his body", one of the most distinguished titles at the time and normally reserved to princes of royal blood. Yet neither Seshemnefer III's father nor his mother seems to have belonged to the royal family. For the period spanning the reign of Djedkare until that of Teti, viziers were furthermore responsible for the weaponry of the state, both for military and other purposes. Following the reforms undertaken by Djedkare, three viziers would be in office at the same time: two in the Memphite region and a Southern one, the "governor of Upper Egypt", with a seat at Abydos. In total six viziers were appointed during Djedkare's reign.

Lower ranking officials lost power during the late Fifth Dynasty and were frequently limited to holding only one high title, a departure from the preceding period. Such functions as "overseer of the granary" and "overseer of the treasury" disappear from the record some time between Djedkare's reign and that of Teti, while men of lower status became head of the legal administration. Consequently, the viziers concentrated more power than before while lower echelons of the state administration were reduced. At the same time, the size of the provincial administration was increased, and it also became more autonomous from the central government. In particular, the nomarchs were responsible in their provinces for performing works hitherto conducted by Memphite officials.

Building activities
The main building activity undertaken during the reign of Djedkare was the construction of his pyramid complex in Saqqara. Djedkare also either completed or undertook restoration works in the funerary complex of Nyuserre Ini in Abusir, as indicated by a now damaged inscription, which must have detailed Djedkare's activities on the site. Further building works took place in Abusir during the second half of Djedkare's reign following the curious decision by members of the royal family to be buried there rather than next to Djedkare's pyramid in Saqqara. A group of mastabas was thus constructed for princess Kekheretnebti and her daughter Tisethor, princess Hedjetnebu, the courtiers Mernefu and Idu, who was buried with his wife Khenit, and prince Neserkauhor.

Djedkare also undertook building activities in relation with his "sed" festival as indicated by a decree that he sent to his vizier Senedjemib Inti on the year of the 16th cattle count, praising him for his work. The decree mentions the construction of a broad rectangular court or artificial lake for the jubilee of the king, some 1000 cubits long and 400 cubits wide, amounting to c. . The court was located within the precincts of a palace built for the ceremonies of the "sed" festival, which was probably located in the vicinity of his pyramid. Another decree addressed to Senedjemib Inti and later inscribed on the walls of his mastaba records the decoration of a chapel of Hathor in the palace of the king. This chapel was most likely built during his reign.

Djedkare may have left some of his monuments unfinished at his death, as suggested by several relief-bearing blocks inscribed with his name and which were found reused in the pyramid of king Unas. Their original setting remains unknown. A reused granite block with the king's name was also found at the pyramid of Amenemhat I at Lisht.

Activities outside Egypt

Expeditions to mines and quarries
Three or four rock inscriptions dating to Djedkare's reign have been found in the Wadi Maghareh in Sinai, where mines of copper and semi-precious stones were exploited throughout the Old Kingdom, from the Fourth until the Sixth Dynasty. These inscriptions record three expeditions sent to look for turquoise: the earliest one, dated to the third or fourth cattle count–possibly corresponding to the sixth or eighth year of Dejdkare's reign–explicitly recalls the arrival of the mining party to the "hills of the turquoise" after being given "divine authority for the finding of semi-precious stones in the writing of the god himself, [as was enacted] in the broad court of the temple Nekhenre". This sentence could indicate the earliest known record of an oracular divination undertaken in order to ensure the success of the expedition prior to its departure, Nekhenre being the sun temple of Userkaf.
Another inscription dating to the year of the ninth cattle count–possibly Djedkare's 18th year on the throne – shows the king "subduing all foreign lands. Smiting the chief of the foreign land". The expedition that left this inscription comprised over 1400 men and administration officials. Some Egyptologists have proposed that these men were also sent to mine copper.

These expeditions departed Egypt from the port of Ain Sukhna, on the western shore of the Gulf of Suez, as revealed by papyri and seals bearing Djedkare's name found on the site. The port comprised large galleries carved into the sandstone serving as living quarters and storage places. The wall of one such gallery was inscribed with a text mentioning yet another expedition to the hills of turquoise in the year of the seventh cattle count–possibly Djedkare's 14th year on the throne. In early 2018, more than 220 clay seals bearing the serekh of Djedkare were uncovered in Tell Edfu in the south of Upper Egypt. These seals have been found in close association with copper ore, Nubian pottery, the remains of two large buildings and a settlement. Edfu, called Behdet by the ancient Egyptians, was likely the place of departure for the mining expeditions sent to the Eastern desert and the Red Sea during Djedkare's reign. These expeditions were undertaken by a special group of prospectors, called the sementiu, who were under the orders of an administration official sent by the king from Memphis to Edfu.

Djedkare was not the first king to do so, as these quarries were already exploited during the Fourth Dynasty and continued to be so during the Sixth Dynasty and later, in the Middle Kingdom period (c. 2055 BC – c. 1650 BC).

Djedkare probably also exploited gold mines in the Eastern Desert and in Nubia: indeed, the earliest mention of the "land of gold" – an Ancient Egyptian term for Nubia – is found in an inscription from the mortuary temple of Djedkare.

Trade relations
Egypt entertained continuing trade relations with the Levant during Djedkare's reign, possibly as far north as Anatolia. A gold cylinder seal bearing the serekh of Djedkare together with the cartouche of Menkauhor Kaiu is now on display at the Museum of Fine Arts, Boston. The seal, whose gold may originate from the Pactolus river valley in western Anatolia, could attest to wide-ranging trade-contacts during the later Fifth Dynasty, but its provenance remains unverifiable.

Trade contacts with Byblos, on the coast of modern-day Lebanon, are suggested by a fragmentary stone vessel unearthed in the city and bearing the inscription "King of Upper and Lower Egypt, Djedkare [living] forever". A biographical inscription discovered in the tomb of Iny, a Sixth Dynasty official, provides further evidence for an Egyptian expedition to Byblos during Djedkare's reign. Iny's inscription relates his travels to procure lapis lazuli and lead or tin for pharaoh Merenre, but starts by recounting what must have been similar events taking place under Djedkare.

To the south of Egypt, Djedkare also sent an expedition to the fabled Land of Punt to procure the myrrh used as incense in the Egyptian temples. The expedition to Punt is referred to in the letter from Pepi II Neferkare to Harkuf some 100 years later. Harkuf had reported that he would bring back a "dwarf of the god's dancers from the land of the horizon dwellers". Pepi mentions that the god's sealbearer Werdjededkhnum had returned from Punt with a dwarf during the reign of Djedkare and had been richly rewarded. The decree mentions that "My Majesty will do for you something greater than what was done for the god's sealbearer Werdjededkhnum in the reign of Isesi, reflecting my majesty's yearning to see this dwarf".

Warfare
Not all relations between Egypt and its neighbors were peaceful during Djedkare's reign. In particular, one of the earliest known depictions of a battle or a city being besieged is found in the tomb of Inti, an official from the 21st nome of Upper Egypt, who lived during the late Fifth Dynasty. The scene shows Egyptian soldiers scaling the walls of a Near Eastern fortress on ladders. More generally, ancient Egyptians seem to have regularly organised punitive raids in Canaan during the later Old Kingdom period but did not attempt to establish a permanent dominion there.

Pyramid

Djedkare built his pyramid in South Saqqara. It was called Nefer Isesi or Nefer Djedkare in Ancient Egyptian, variously translated as "Isesi/Djedkare is beautiful" or "Isesi/Djedkare is perfect". It is known today as Haram el-Shawwâf, because it stands on the edge of the Nile valley.

The pyramid originally comprised six or seven steps made of irregular and roughly hewn limestone blocks and mortar, of which only three survive. This core was overlaid by casing stones of white Tura limestone, which were stolen in antiquity.

In the interior of the pyramid a descending passage led, behind three granite portcullises, to an antechamber, three magazine rooms and the burial chamber. In the burial chamber, pieces of alabaster and a faience bead on a gold thread were discovered, as well as many fragments of what was originally a large sarcophagus of dark grey basalt. The sarcophagus was sunk into the floor of the burial chamber and there was a niche for the canopic chest of the king to its north-east. An almost complete mummy was discovered in the remnants of the sarcophagus. An examination by Ahmed Batrawi of these skeletal remains, excavated in the mid-1940s under the direction of Abdel-Salam Hussein, suggests that Djedkare died at the age of 50 to 60 years.

To the east of the pyramid, Djedkare's mortuary temple was laid out. Its eastern façade was flanked by two massive stone structures, which resemble the later pylons. The mortuary temple is connected via a yet unexcavated causeway to a valley temple.

Legacy

Impact of the reforms

For Nigel Strudwick, the reforms of Djedkare were undertaken as a reaction to the rapid growth of the central administration in the first part of the Fifth Dynasty which, Baer adds, had amassed too much political or economic power in the eyes of the king. Joyce Tyldesley sees the reign of Djedkare as the very beginning of a decline in the importance of the king, in conjunction with the gradual rise of the power wielded by the high and provincial administration. Concurrent with this trend is a process of decentralization, with local loyalties slowly superseding allegiance to the central state. Since offices and the vizierate in particular could be inherited, the reforms of Djedkare created a "virtual feudal system" as Nicolas Grimal writes, with much power in the hands of a few puissant officials. This is best witnessed by the large, magnificent mastaba tombs that Djedkare's viziers built. In this context, Djedkare's reforms of the ranking system might have been an attempt at maintaining a sprawling administration under control, yet ultimately failed. For some Egyptologists, such as Naguib Kanawati, this failure contributed in no small part to the fall of the Old Kingdom, but others, including Strudwick, believe the reasons of the collapse must be sought elsewhere as the power of an administration official never approached that of the king.

The reforms of Djedkare played an important role in flourishing of the arts during the later Old Kingdom, as artisans and craftsmen could now find many wealthy patrons beyond the king. This created a surge in the number of commissions leading to a general improvement of the artistic works. This also provided the artisans with a new wealth, which they used to build their own large funerary complexes.

Funerary cult

Old Kingdom

Djedkare was the object of a funerary cult established at his death and which lasted until the end of the Old Kingdom nearly 200 years later. Provisions for this cult were produced in several agricultural estates set up during Djedkare's reign. The names of some of these estates have been found inscribed on the walls of the tombs of his courtiers: "Ra desires that Isesi lives", "Heqa desires that Izezi live", "Perfect of emulation is Isesi", "The mnza-vessel of Djedkare", "Perfect of favors is Isesi", "Seshat makes Isesi live", "The Ka of Isesi is foremost", "Dominion belongs to Izezi",  "Work of the command of Izezi", "Bastet wishes that Izezi lives", "Horus perpetuates Izezi", "The offerings of Izezi", and "Izezi is one who loves life".

Djedkare seems to have been held in high esteem during the Sixth Dynasty. For example, Merenre Nemtyemsaf I chose to place his pyramid complex close to that of Djedkare. In addition, the South Saqqara Stone, a royal annal dating to the reign of Merenre or of his successor Pepi II, records rich offerings being made to Djedkare on behalf of the king. An estimated 92% of the text inscribed on the stone was lost when it was roughly polished to be reused as a sarcophagus lid, possibly in the late First Intermediate (c. 2160–2055 BC) to early Middle Kingdom period (c. 2055–1650 BC).

More generally, an historical or literary tradition concerning events in the time of Djedkare seems to have flourished toward the end of Old Kingdom as can be inferred from the tombs of Harkuf and Iny. These two officials were in charge of expeditions to foreign lands–Punt and Byblos– under Merenre I and Pepi II and both relate similar expeditions that took place during the time of Djedkare.

New Kingdom
The funerary cult of Djedkare enjoyed a revival during the New Kingdom (c. 1550–1077 BC). For the early part of this period, this is best attested by the Karnak king list, a list of kings commissioned by pharaoh Thutmose III. The list was not meant to be exhaustive, rather it gave the names of Thutmose's forefathers whom he wanted to honor by dedicating offerings.

For the later New Kingdom, a relief from the Saqqara tomb of the priest Mehu, dating to the 19th or 20th Dynasty shows three gods faced by several deceased pharaohs. These are Djoser and Sekhemket, of the Third Dynasty and Userkaf, founder of the Fifth Dynasty. He is followed by a fourth king whose name is damaged but which is often read "Djedkare" or, much less likely, "Shepseskare". The relief is an expression of personal piety on Mehu's behalf, who prayed to the ancient kings for them to recommend him to the gods.

See also
 List of pharaohs

Notes

References

Bibliography

 
25th-century BC Pharaohs
24th-century BC Pharaohs
Pharaohs of the Fifth Dynasty of Egypt
Ancient Egyptian mummies